Gary Window (born 11 January 1941) is a former Australian rules footballer who played with Central District in the South Australian National Football League (SANFL).

Window played his football in either the centre or at centre half-forward. He was one of the early stars of the Central District Football Club, winning the Magarey Medal in 1965 to become the club's first ever recipient of the award. Window was also the first ever Central District player to be chosen to represent South Australia at interstate football. Injury and loss of form in the subsequent years restricted him to a total of 84 SANFL games. He later became a football commentator and was famous for his enthusiasm and lack of inhibition. In 2005 he was inducted into the SA Football Hall of Fame.

References

External links
 
 SA Football Hall of Fame – Gary Window

Central District Football Club players
Central District Football Club coaches
Magarey Medal winners
Australian rules footballers from South Australia
South Australian Football Hall of Fame inductees
Living people
1941 births